Chácara das Flores ("small farm of flowers") is a bairro in the District of Sede in the municipality of Santa Maria, in the Brazilian state of Rio Grande do Sul. It is located in north Santa Maria.

Villages 
The bairro contains the following villages: Balneário das Pedras Brancas, Chácara das Flores, Chácara das Rosas, Desmembramento Fernando Friedrich, Vila Cerro Azul, Vila das Flores, Vila Itagiba, Vila Sant'Anna, Vila Santa Terezinha, Vila São Rafael, Vila Tiarajú, Vila Vitória.

Gallery of photos

References 

Bairros of Santa Maria, Rio Grande do Sul